Somatina virginalis is a moth of the family Geometridae. It is found in Angola, the Democratic Republic of Congo, Kenya, Malawi, Sierra Leone, South Africa, Tanzania, Uganda and Zimbabwe.

References

Moths described in 1917
Scopulini
Moths of Africa